Margaret Loomis (1893–1969) was an American film actress of the silent era.

Loomis was an only child.

In addition to her acting, Loomis was a Denishawn dancer. She toured the United States as a member of the Denishawn School's initial troupe before she became an actress in films.

Loomis was married to Los Angeles businessman Richard Wayne Crook.

Selected filmography
 The Call of the East (1917)
 The Bottle Imp (1917)
 Hashimura Togo (1917)
 The Hidden Pearls (1918)
 When a Man Loves (1919)
 Everywoman (1919)
 Told in the Hills (1919)
 The Veiled Adventure (1919)
 Why Smith Left Home (1919)
 Always Audacious (1920)
 What Happened to Jones (1920)
 The Sins of St. Anthony (1920)
 Conrad in Quest of His Youth (1920)
 3 Gold Coins (1920)
 A Kiss in Time (1921)
 Turn to the Right (1922)
 The Hands of Nara (1922)
 The Strangers' Banquet (1922)
 Money! Money! Money! (1923)
 Bell Boy 13 (1923)
 Law of the Lawless (1923)
 My Neighbor's Wife (1925)

References

Bibliography
 Goble, Alan. The Complete Index to Literary Sources in Film. Walter de Gruyter, 1999.

External links

1893 births
1969 deaths
American film actresses
People from San Francisco
20th-century American actresses